Francisco Zaera is a Venezuelan-American chemist, currently a Distinguished Professor at University of California, Riverside and an Elected Fellow of the American Association for the Advancement of Science, the American Chemical Society and the American Vacuum Society.

Zaera obtained his BS degree from the Simón Bolívar University in Caracas, Venezuela in 1979. He then got his Ph.D. from the University of California, Berkeley in 1984 and until 1986 served as a postdoc at Brookhaven National Laboratory.

References

External links

Year of birth missing (living people)
Living people
Fellows of the American Association for the Advancement of Science
University of California, Riverside faculty
21st-century American chemists
Simón Bolívar University (Venezuela) alumni
University of California, Berkeley alumni
Fellows of the American Chemical Society
Place of birth missing (living people)